Vice-Admiral the Hon. Herbert Edward Holmes à Court (16 February 1869 – 21 October 1934) was an officer of the Royal Navy. His commands included HMS Revenge, HMS St Vincent, and the Royal Naval College, Osborne.

Early life
Holmes à Court was the fifth of the seven sons of William Leonard Holmes à Court (1835—1885), a Deputy Lieutenant of the Isle of Wight and the eldest son and heir of William à Court-Holmes, 2nd Baron Heytesbury. His mother was a cousin of the Heytesbury family, Isabella Sophia, daughter of the Rev. Richard à Court Beadon, Vicar of Cheddar, Somerset, and a grand-daughter of Annabella à Court, sister of the first Lord Heytesbury. His six brothers included the third and fourth Lords Heytesbury, and he also had three sisters.

Born at Codford St Peter, his early years were spent around Heytesbury in Wiltshire, and in July 1882, aged thirteen, he joined the Royal Navy training ship HMS Britannia at Dartmouth.

Naval career

After his training as a naval cadet, Holmes à Court began his active service career as a Midshipman. He was promoted to Lieutenant on 17 December 1890 and to Commander on 26 June 1902.

On 1 September 1907 he was appointed as Assistant to the Inspector of Target Practice, and was promoted to Captain on 31 December 1907. In April 1909 he was given his first command, the elderly second-class cruiser HMS Leander, and in February 1910 was moved to captain the much newer protected cruiser HMS Sapphire, at the same time becoming Captain of the Fifth Destroyer Flotilla. His subsequent commands were the gunnery training ship HMS Revenge (December 1910) and the important Dreadnought HMS St Vincent (January to December 1912). Holmes à Court's final command, from 1 August 1914, was the Royal Naval College, Osborne, and its training ship HMS Racer. He served out the whole of the Great War at Osborne and retired from his post in December 1918. He was promoted to Rear-Admiral on the Retired List in February 1919 and to Vice-Admiral in 1924.

Following Holmes à Court's death, Admiral Sir William Hall wrote to The Times that

Private life
On the death of Holmes à Court's grandfather Lord Heytesbury in 1891, his father had already died, so the peerage went to his oldest brother. At the same time he and his five other brothers were raised to the rank of baron's sons, carrying with it the courtesy title of the Honourable.

In retirement in 1923, Holmes à Court was living at Bishopstrow, near the family seat of Heytesbury. On 4 July 1927, several years after his retirement from active service, he married Lydia Gertrude, a daughter of William Manning, of Wing, Buckinghamshire, and the widow of Holmes à Court's brother the Hon. Charles Holmes à Court (1867–1922). The wedding took place less than a week after it had been announced in The Times, which was said to be owing to illness.

In the event, Holmes à Court survived the illness and lived for another seven years. His funeral took place on 24 October 1934 at the church of Leonard Stanley, Gloucestershire. His widow died on 19 November 1967.

Arms
In Armorial Families (1895), A. C. Fox-Davies reported that Holmes à Court was a Lieutenant in the Royal Navy and blazoned his arms as:

Notes

External links
Herbert Edward Holmes A'COURT at militaryimages.net

1869 births
1934 deaths
Holmes à Court family
Royal Navy vice admirals
People from Wiltshire